David McMahon (born 19 October 1951) is a former Australian rules footballer who played with Fitzroy in the VFL.

McMahon played on the half forward flank and after being recruited from Preston he made his league debut in 1973. He retired in 1984 with 218 VFL games to his name which puts him at 7th on the all-time list for the now defunct club.

External links

1951 births
Living people
Australian rules footballers from Victoria (Australia)
Fitzroy Football Club players
Preston Football Club (VFA) players
Ivanhoe Amateurs Football Club players